Duckabush may refer to:

 Duckabush, Washington
 Mount Duckabush in Washington, USA
 Duckabush River, which runs near the mountain